Lemuel Chenoweth (25 June 1811—26 August 1887) was a carpenter, legislator and self-taught architect. He is best known as one of 19th century America's master covered bridge builders.

Chenoweth and his brother Eli constructed 20 bridges during the 1840s and '50s, most of them covered, on four western Virginia turnpikes, notably on the Staunton-Parkersburg Turnpike system in what is now West Virginia.

Biography

Chenoweth was born, lived and died in Randolph County, Virginia (later West Virginia). In his youth, Chenoweth built churches, houses, sideboards, poster beds, buggies, wagons, a model of a reverse-cutting sawmill, and even made dominoes.

Chenoweth became an associate of Claudius Crozet (1789–1864), a noted French-born civil engineer who oversaw the design and construction of Virginia's transportation infrastructure of turnpikes, canals, and roads with funding by the Virginia Board of Public Works and the General Assembly of Virginia prior to the American Civil War (1861-1865). He was also strongly influenced by the bridge framing system developed in 1817 by Theodore Burr (1771–1822) —  the Burr arch-truss structural design — which improved bridge strength dramatically.

Chenoweth's best-known surviving bridge is the Philippi Covered Bridge (1852) spanning the Tygart Valley River and carrying U.S. Route 250 in Philippi. It is an outstanding example of a modified Burr truss bridge with two spans totaling . It is also the only covered bridge in the United States currently incorporated into the national primary highway system, although it has been extensively reinforced and reconstructed.

The only other Chenoweth covered bridge to survive to the present day is located at Barrackville in Marion County. Several homes and the Huttonsville Presbyterian Church in Huttonsville are also among Chenoweth's extant creations.

Chenoweth was buried in the Beverly Cemetery.

Legacy
The Lemuel Chenoweth House Museum operates in the post and beam house that Chenoweth built for himself in Beverly in 1856.

List of Chenoweth bridges

Beverly Covered Bridge, 1846–47, across the Tygart Valley River; Chenoweth's first bridge (burnt by Gen. Rosser, 1865; rebuilt by Chenoweth 1872–73; destroyed again post-1952).
Middle Fork Covered Bridge, 18??, across Middle Fork River (destroyed).
Buckhannon Covered Bridge, 18??, across the Buckhannon River (destroyed).
Weston Covered Bridge, 18??, across Stone Coal Creek (destroyed).
 ????? Bridge, ca. 1850, across the West Fork River at Hunsaker's Ferry, near Fairmont (destroyed).
Philippi Covered Bridge, 1852, across the Tygart Valley River (narrowly averted burning by Gen. Jones, 1863; surviving).
Paw Paw Creek Covered Bridge, near Grant Town, West Virginia, 185? (destroyed).
Barrackville Covered Bridge, 1853, across Buffalo Creek (surviving); serviced the Fairmont-Wheeling Turnpike.
Marlin's Bottom Covered Bridge, 1850s, across the Greenbrier River (removed and replaced, 1915).

See also
List of West Virginia covered bridges

References

External links 
 Historic Beverly information on museum
 Lemuel Chenoweth House and Museum website

1811 births
1887 deaths
Architects from West Virginia
American bridge engineers
Engineers from West Virginia
People from Beverly, West Virginia
19th-century American architects